Elise Stacy (born 2 April 1987) is a former Australian field hockey player.

Personal life
Elise Stacy was born and raised in Adelaide. She lives in Sydney with her husband Justin Kosmina to whom she married on 9 April 2021.

Hockey

Domestic career
Stacy played for the Southern Suns in Hockey Australia's former premier domestic league, the Australian Hockey League (AHL). During her career in the AHL, Stacy won one national title with the team. In 2011, during the 19th edition of the competition, the Southern Suns defeated the NSW Arrows to win the title.

Hockeyroos
Elise Stacy was first selected in the Australian national squad in 2010.

She made her senior international debut in 2011 during a test series against India in Perth, where she also scored her first international goal. She followed this up with an appearance during the succeeding test series against China in Busselton.

International goals

The Bachelor Australia
In 2017, Stacy was a contestant on the fifth season of the reality series The Bachelor Australia. Stacy finished as runner-up on the show, with Matty Johnson deciding to enter a relationship with Laura Byrne.

References

1987 births
Living people
Australian female field hockey players